In cell biology, there are a multitude of signalling pathways. Cell signalling is part of the molecular biology system that controls and coordinates the actions of cells.

 Akt/PKB signalling pathway
 AMPK signalling pathway
 cAMP-dependent pathway
 Eph/ephrin signalling pathway
 Hedgehog signalling pathway
 Hippo signalling pathway
 Insulin signal transduction pathway
 JAK-STAT signalling pathway
 MAPK/ERK signalling pathway
 mTOR signalling pathway
 Nodal signalling pathway
 Notch signalling pathway
 PI3K/AKT/mTOR signalling pathway
 TGF beta signalling pathway
 TLR signalling pathway
 VEGF signalling pathway
 Wnt signalling pathway

References

Cell signaling
Signalling pathways